Abhinavano Rasavichar (English: Rasa theory of Abhinavagupta) is a 1969 Gujarati language collection of critical essays by Indian writer Nagindas Parekh that deals with the theory of Indian poetics. The work won the Sahitya Akademi Award in 1970.

Background
The book was published in 1969 and was awarded the Sahitya Akademi Award in 1970.

Contents
In Abhinavano Rasavichar, the author has examined the theory of Indian poetics. The work has eight essays.

The title essay explains Abhinavagupta's view on Rasa as expressed in his commentary on Bharata's Natya Shastra. The other articles discuss Vakrokti theory of Kuntaka, Ramaniyata theory of Jagannath. It discusses in details about Śṛṅgāraḥ (erotic), Hāsya (humour) and Shānta (sublime) sentiments, Auchitya (propriety) and Rasabhas (illusory experience of pleasure). The author has also discussed the poetic form of akhyana, showing how Akhyana was a figure of speech, and it was falsely interpreted as a form of poetry.

Reception
For its profundity of erudition, soundness of judgement and its flowing prose, Abhinavano Rasavichar is considered an outstanding contribution to Gujarati literature.

References

External links
  (Hindi translation)

1969 non-fiction books
Gujarati-language books
Sahitya Akademi Award-winning works
Indian non-fiction books